Year of Sunday is the third album by soft rock duo Seals and Crofts. It was released in 1971 on Warner Bros. Records and was their first record for a major label.

Track listing 
All songs written by Jim Seals and Dash Crofts unless otherwise indicated

Side One
"When I Meet Them" – 3:15
"'Cause You Love" (Jim Seals) – 3:22
"Antoinette" – 3:37
"High on a Mountain" (Bobby Lichtig, Seals) – 4:08
"Year of Sunday" – 5:48

Side Two
"Paper Airplanes" – 2:41
"Irish Linen" – 3:27
"Springfield Mill" (Seals, Vince Clark) – 3:05
"Ancient of the Old" – 3:25
"Sudan Village" – 4:08

Charts

Personnel 
 Jim Seals – guitar, fiddle, vocals
 Dash Crofts – mandolin, vocals (except on "High on a Mountain")
 Louie Shelton – guitar
 Larry Muhoberac – keyboards
 Bobby Lichtig – bass
 Russ Kunkel – drums
 Victor Feldman – percussion
Recorded at A&M Studios, Hollywood and Morgan Studios, London

References

Seals and Crofts albums
1971 albums
Warner Records albums
Albums recorded at A&M Studios
Albums recorded at Morgan Sound Studios